A goalsneak is an Australian rules football player whose job is to kick goals in a game, especially as a crumber. It usually describes a forward player, particularly a player in a forward pocket, who is small and nimble. A goalsneak may use his pace and cunning to snatch a goal after a running play where a larger player would use brute strength and/or height to mark the ball.

Sources 

Australian rules football terminology